Shot in the Frontier is a 1954 short subject directed by Jules White starring American slapstick comedy team The Three Stooges (Moe Howard, Larry Fine and Shemp Howard). It is the 157th entry in the series released by Columbia Pictures starring the comedians, who released 190 shorts for the studio between 1934 and 1959.

Plot
It is only after their nuptials that the Stooges discover that the Noonan brothers took a liking to the wives during the Stooges' recent absence, and vowed to kill our heroes if the weddings occurred. After the Sheriff/Justice of the Peace leaves, the Stooges are stalked by the Noonan brothers, engaging in a slapstick gun battle, and in the end, a fist fight.

Cast

Credited
 Moe Howard as Moe
 Larry Fine as Larry
 Shemp Howard as Shemp

Uncredited

 Ruth Godfrey as Stella
 Vivian Mason as Ella
 Diana Darrin as Bella
 Kenneth MacDonald as Bill Noonan
 Mort Mills as Dick Noonan
 Joe Palma as Jack Noonan
 Emil Sitka as Justice of the Peace
 Emmett Lynn as Lem
 Wanda Perry as Wedding witness
 Harold Kening as Wedding witness
 Harriette Tarler as Mandy

Production notes
Shot in the Frontier was filmed on October 26–28, 1953, nearly one year prior to its release. It is a parody of the 1952 Stanley Kramer Western High Noon.

This is one of only two shorts released in 1954 containing all new footage, the other being Income Tax Sappy. Shemp Howard did not slick down his long hair in either film. This was because he had begun dying his hair by this time, and initially could not use pomade.

References

External links 
 
 
Shot in the Frontier at threestooges.net

1954 films
The Three Stooges films
American black-and-white films
Films directed by Jules White
Columbia Pictures short films
1950s Western (genre) comedy films
American Western (genre) comedy films
1954 comedy films
1950s English-language films
1950s American films